Ralph Pomeroy Buckland (January 20, 1812 – May 27, 1892) was a U.S. Representative from Ohio, as well as a brigadier general in the Union Army during the American Civil War and an executive of the Union Pacific Railroad following the war.

Early life and career

Born in Leyden, Massachusetts Buckland moved with his parents to Ravenna, Ohio, the same year. He attended the country schools, Tallmadge (Ohio) Academy, and Kenyon College in Gambier, Ohio. After studying law, he was admitted to the bar in 1837 and commenced practice in Fremont, Ohio. He served as the mayor of Fremont from 1843 to 1845 and was a delegate to the Whig National Convention in 1848. He served as a member of the Ohio State Senate from 1855 to 1859.

Civil War service
With the outbreak of the Civil War, Buckland entered the Union Army as the colonel of the 72nd Ohio Infantry on January 10, 1862. Buckland commanded the Fourth Brigade in William T. Sherman's 5th Division of the Army of the Tennessee at the Battle of Shiloh in April. He was commissioned as a brigadier general of volunteers on November 29, 1862. During the Siege of Vicksburg in the spring and early summer of 1863, Buckland commanded a brigade in Sherman's XV Corps.

He resigned from the army January 6, 1865, and returned to Ohio after winning election to the United States Congress. In the omnibus promotions following the surrender of the Confederate armies, he was brevetted as a major general dating from March 13, 1865.

Postbellum career
Buckland was elected as a Republican to the Thirty-ninth and Fortieth Congresses (March 4, 1865 – March 4, 1869). He was not a candidate for renomination in 1868 to the Forty-first Congress. He resumed the practice of law and served as a delegate to the Philadelphia Loyalists' Convention in 1866 and to the Pittsburgh Soldiers' Convention.

He served as a delegate to the 1876 Republican National Convention. He spent his later years involved in the railroad industry, serving as government director of the Union Pacific Railroad from 1877 to 1880. Presidential elector in 1884 for Blaine/Logan.

On December 1, 1879, along with Attorneys E.F. Dickinson, Basil Meek, Homer Everett, William Ross and others, Buckland helped establish the Sandusky County Bar Association, serving as its first president for many years.

Buckland was one of the most prominent members of St. Paul's Episcopal Church in downtown Fremont.  He died in Fremont on May 27, 1892, and was interred in Oakwood Cemetery.

See also

List of American Civil War generals (Union)
List of Ohio's American Civil War generals
Ohio in the American Civil War

References

 Retrieved on 2008-10-18

1812 births
Mayors of places in Ohio
1892 deaths
Members of the United States House of Representatives from Ohio
Union Army generals
People of Ohio in the American Civil War
People from Fremont, Ohio
Ohio Republicans
Ohio Whigs
Ohio state senators
Kenyon College alumni
Union Pacific Railroad people
19th-century American railroad executives
People from Leyden, Massachusetts
1884 United States presidential electors
Republican Party members of the United States House of Representatives
19th-century American politicians
People from Ravenna, Ohio
Military personnel from Massachusetts